Redbridge Football Club is an English association football club based in Barkingside in the London Borough of Redbridge. Prior to July 2004 the club was known as Ford United F.C.  The change of name was chosen to help associate the club within the local area and attract a larger support.

They should not be confused with the former Redbridge Forest, a predecessor of the current Dagenham & Redbridge, though both come from the borough of Redbridge in Greater London.

History
The club's roots lie in the car industry, which has long been a staple of the local economy in the surrounding part of East London and Essex.

The club was previously known as Ford United, which dated from a 1959 merger between two older clubs, Ford Sports (Dagenham), the football team of the workers at the huge local Ford Motors factory at Dagenham, and Briggs Sports, both of which were founded in 1934. Up until World War II, the latter actually began life as Briggs Motor Bodies and entered a team in the London League under that name between 1935 and 1951.

As Ford United, they performed well in the Aetolian League winning the title twice, and finishing runners up once. The club found itself in serious trouble at the start of 1995–96 season, however, as sponsorship from the Ford Motor Company was ended and the disbanding of the club seemed highly likely, until club vice-chairman, George Adams enlisted Sky Sports as sponsors, rescuing the club financially.

During the 2001–02 season Barkingside's lease at their Oakside ground was sold on to Ford United who needed to find a permanent home to allow their progression up the football pyramid. Considerable investment by Jimmy Chapman, the then Chairman saw Oakside developed to a grade 1 ground.

From the start of the 2004–05 season, Ford United were renamed to Redbridge, as the club sought to establish a local identity and improve its support base.

Redbridge played the 2005–06 season in the Isthmian League Premier Division, as they were relegated after finishing bottom of Conference South, and played in the Isthmian League Division One North in the 2006–07 season after being relegated once again. New manager, ex-Wimbledon and Bolton Wanderers striker Dean Holdsworth was appointed on 30 June 2007. In the 2007–08 season, they missed the opportunity to be promoted back to the Isthmian League Premier Division, losing 5–4 on penalties to Canvey Island in the playoff final, after finishing third in the Isthmian League Division One North. On 18 May 2008, Holdsworth left his post as manager of Redbridge to take up the manager's position at Newport County.

At the start of June 2008, former Dagenham & Redbridge reserve team coach, Jay Devereux was appointed the club's new manager. Devereux's first season was blighted by floodlight problems at Oakside, but the team still finished a respectable eighth in the division. The side had a disappointing start to the 2009–10 season and towards the end of September, it was announced that Devereux and his coaching staff had resigned from their jobs. First team coach Dave Ross took charge for Redbridge's game at Harlow Town, where they drew 3–3 after being 2–0 down and stayed as manager for the remainder of the season. Poor winter weather affected the side at the start of 2010, the team initially struggled with a fixture pile up but Ross managed to keep the side in the league avoiding relegation.

The 2010–11 season proved to be one of the most turbulent in the club's history. Manager Dave Ross brought in Kris Taylor to form a management team. After a bad start to the season, which saw the club sitting bottom of the league and Ross was eventually asked to step down. Kris Taylor was confirmed as first team manager on 1 October 2010, after talks broke down with Kevin Durrant who looked all set to join the club. Taylor's tenure ended in December 2010 when his work commitments affected the amount of time demanded to run a club of this stature meant he was unable to give 100% to the management of the team. First team coach Jody Brown was appointed manager on a short-term basis just before Christmas 2010 and he was able to bring some stability and stave of relegation with three games of the season still remaining.

Chairman Dan Holloway moved quickly at the end of the season to make the changes that will bring the structure and stability needed at a football club at this level. Terry Spillane was appointed first team manager after a highly successful spell with Stansted with Jody Brown reverting to a coaching role.

On 29 October 2011, Redbridge reached the First Round Proper of the FA Cup for the first time since 2003 after beating Conference National side Ebbsfleet United 2–0. In the First Round they drew 0–0 with Oxford City and won the replay 2–1 after extra time, thanks to goals by Nathan Gordon and Ben Bradbury. They played League Two leaders Crawley Town in the Second Round, where they were beaten 5–0, against a side four divisions and 106 places above Redbridge in the league pyramid. The team ended the season well finishing 6th place just 4 points off the play off positions. However, soon after the season finished, Chairman Dan Holloway resigned from the club due to personal reasons and, with the playing budget due to be cut, manager Terry Spillane felt it was not possible to move the team any further and he and his footballing staff left to join fellow Division One North side Maldon & Tiptree.

A new joint management team made up of Del Robinson and ex Gravesend and Northfleet legend Steve Portway took charge for the 2012–13 season. After a poor start to the season, the team improved in the second half of the season and fought off survival on the last-day to finish 20th and secure another season in the Isthmian League.  Former London Bari Chairman Imran Merchant took control of the club ahead of the 2013–14 season appointing Ricky Eaton alongside ex-Redbridge manager Dave Ross as joint managers of the club. After a steady season, Merchant stepped down with former Chairman Jimmy Chapman taking over again and although finished within the relegation positions were given a reprieve when Southern League side Clevedon Town lost a ground grading appeal. The following season saw no improvement on the pitch and although they performed well in the local cup competitions they finished bottom of Division One North resulting in relegation back to the Essex Senior League for the first time in 19 years.

Ricky Eaton took over from Jim Chapman in the boardroom combining the role of 1st team manager and chairman and an inconsistent debut season back in the Essex Senior League saw a 14th-place finish. The following season Dave Ross left the club to be replaced by ex Hornchurch and Canvey Island player Joey May and as a joint management team along with Ricky they assembled a strong side looking for promotion into the Isthmian League and although were in the top two promotion places for most of the season they eventually fell short finishing in 4th place.

The side were sitting in 8th position when the 2019–20 season was declared null and void due to the COVID-19 pandemic and although the 2020–21 season did commence in September Micky decided to step down from his position after just 5 matches due to personal reasons.  Chairman Ricky Eaton acted quickly in bringing former Aveley Reserves manager George Christou to the club however the season was severely disrupted due to the ongoing pandemic and government lockdowns resulting in the season being curtailed with him only managing the team for eight games.

Ground

Redbridge play their home games at the Oakside Stadium, Barkingside, Ilford, Essex, IG6 1NB.

Current squad
As of Jul 22

Honours
Aetolian Division One 
 winners (2): 1959–60, 1961–62
Essex Elizabethan League
 winners (2): 1959–60, 1960–61
Essex Senior League
 winners (2): 1991–92, 1996–97
Greater London League
 winners (1): 1970–71
Isthmian League
Division One Champions 2001–02
Division Three Champions 1998–99
Division Two North Champions 1988–89

Cups
Essex Elizabethan Cup
 winners (1): 1970–71
Essex Senior League Cup 
 winners (1) 1985–86
Essex Thameside Trophy Winners
 winners (2): 1998–99, 2003–04
Essex Senior Trophy
 winners (2): 1990–91, 1991–92
London Senior Cup
 winners (2): 1993–94, 1997–98, 2000–01
Essex Saturday Junior Trophy
 winners (1): 1978–79
Len Cordell Memorial Cup
 winners (1): 2020-21
Peter Butcher Memorial Cup
 winners (1): 2021-22

Club records
Record Home Attendance: 1374 v Port Vale, FA Cup 1st Round Replay 19.11.03
Record Victory: 10–0 v St Margaretsbury(a), Essex Senior League 27.04.19
Record Defeat: 0–11 v Heybridge Swifts(a), Isthmian League Division One North 29.12.12
Best league performance: 22nd in Conference South, 2004–05
Best FA Cup performance: 2nd Round Proper, 2011–12
Best FA Trophy performance: 3rd Round, 2003–04 and 2004–05
Best FA Vase performance: 5th Round, 1998–99

League history
As Redbridge F.C.

References

External links

Football clubs in England
Isthmian League
National League (English football) clubs
Sport in the London Borough of Redbridge
Association football clubs established in 2005
Essex Senior Football League
Metropolitan–London League
Greater London League
Aetolian League (football)
2005 establishments in England
Football clubs in London
Works association football teams in England